Johan Isaac Westergren (12 July 1875 – 16 October 1950) was a Swedish sprinter. He competed at the 1900 Summer Olympics in the 60 m and 100 m events, but failed to reach the finals. He was also Chairperson of the Swedish Ice Hockey Association between November 1922 and November 1924, making him the first person on that position.

References

External links

 De Wael, Herman. Herman's Full Olympians: "Athletics 1900". Accessed 18 March 2006.
 

1875 births
1950 deaths
Olympic athletes of Sweden
Athletes (track and field) at the 1900 Summer Olympics
Swedish male sprinters
People from Gävle
Sportspeople from Gävleborg County
20th-century Swedish people